Perry Perlmutar is a Canadian comedian, from Toronto, Ontario.

He has made many appearances on MuchMusic's Video On Trial.

References

External links
Perry Perlmutar's Myspace at MySpace

Canadian male comedians
Living people
Comedians from Toronto
Year of birth missing (living people)